for the airport's World War II history, see Stuttgart Army Airfield
Stuttgart Municipal Airport  is in Prairie County, Arkansas. It is eight miles north of Stuttgart, which owns the airport and is the county seat of Arkansas County's northern district. The FAA's National Plan of Integrated Airport Systems for 2009–2013 categorized it as a general aviation facility.

History 
Stuttgart Municipal Airport dates to 1942 when it was built by the United States Army Air Forces.  It was used as an advanced twin-engine flying school and glider training.  With the end of World War II,  Stuttgart Army Airfield was  declared excess and closed on 5 August 1946.   It was conveyed though the War Assets Administration (WAA) to the City of Stuttgart to establish a municipal airport.

Trans-Texas DC-3s stopped at Stuttgart from 1953 to 1958–59.

Facilities
It has two runways: 9/27 is 5,002 by 150 feet (1,525 x 46 m) concrete; 18/36 is 6,015 by 100 feet (1,833 x 30 m) asphalt.

In the year ending May 31, 2017 the airport had 40,200 aircraft operations, average 110 per day: 87% general aviation, 7.5% military, and 5.5% air taxi. 42 aircraft were then based at the airport: 65% single-engine, 9% multi-engine, 23% jet and 3% helicopter.

Motorsports 
A  SCCA road course used the runways, with the first race in 1959. The last sports car race was in 1978. A drag strip, Stuttgart Dragway, existed from 1970 to 1972.

See also
 Arkansas World War II Army Airfields

References

External links 
 Stuttgart Municipal Airport
 Google Maps Page of Stuttgart AFB. Features layout of  road course.
 

1942 establishments in Arkansas
Airports in Arkansas
Airports established in 1942
Transportation in Prairie County, Arkansas
Buildings and structures in Prairie County, Arkansas
Defunct motorsport venues in the United States